The 2003 FIVB Men's World Cup was held from 16 to 29 November 2003 in Japan. Twelve men's national teams played in cities all over Japan for the right to a fast lane ticket into the 2004 Summer Olympics in Athens, Greece.

Teams were made up as follows: hosts Japan, continental champions and vice-champions from Europe, Asia, NORCECA and South America, continental champion from Africa plus two wild-card teams nominated jointly by FIVB and the Japan Volleyball Association. Teams played a single-round robin format (66 games overall), in two parallel groups (site A and site B). The men played in Tokyo, Hiroshima, Fukuoka, Nagano, Hamamatsu, and Okayama.

Qualification

Squads

Results

|}

First round

Site A
Venue: Yoyogi National Gymnasium, Tokyo

|}

Site B
Venue: White Ring, Nagano

|}

Second round

Site A
Venue: Hiroshima Green Arena, Hiroshima

|}

Site B
Venue: Hamamatsu Arena, Hamamatsu

|}

Third round

Site A
Venue: Marine Messe, Fukuoka

|}

Site B
Venue: Okayama General and Cultural Gymnasium, Okayama

|}

Fourth round

Site A
Venue: Yoyogi National Gymnasium, Tokyo

|}

Site B
Venue: Tokyo Metropolitan Gymnasium, Tokyo

|}

Final standing

Awards

 Most Valuable Player
  Takahiro Yamamoto
 Best Scorer
  Takahiro Yamamoto
 Best Spiker
  Giovane Gávio
 Best Blocker
  Andrija Gerić

 Best Server
  Andrea Sartoretti
 Best Setter
  Nikola Grbić
 Best Libero
  Sérgio Santos
 Most Spectacular Player
  Daisuke Usami

External links
 Official website
 Final standing
 Awards

2003 Men's
Men's World Cup
V
2003 in Japanese sport

ja:2003年ワールドカップバレーボール#男子競技